Róbson Januário de Paula (born February 14, 1994) is a Brazilian professional footballer who plays as a defender for Portuguese club Farense.

Club career

Breakthrough and loan to Kawasaki Frontale
Róbson was a product of by Bahia's youth academy. In July 2013, he was loaned to Kawasaki Frontale. Due to the injuries of Kawasaki Frontale's centre backs, Yusuke Igawa, Hiroki Ito and Jun Sonoda, Róbson was signed to increase squad's depth. However he only made one appearance for the club which was in Emperor's Cup and returned to Bahia when his loan spell was expired.

Esteghlal (loan)

On 17 July 2016, Róbson signed for Esteghlal F.C. on loan until the end of the 2016–17 season. He made his debut for the club on 31 July 2016 in a 2-1 loss against Esteghlal Khuzestan. After joining Esteghlal, he quickly established himself and became a regular starter in the team. During the season, he made a good partnership with compatriot Padovani in central defense. On 16 September he played his first  Tehran derby against city rivals Persepolis which ended with a goalless draw. On 2 February 2017, he started the AFC Champions League qualifying play-off match facing Al Sadd SC which Esteghlal won in a 4–3 penalty shoot-out following a 0–0 draw following extra time. On 12 February he played the Second Tehran derby, which ended with a 3–2 victory for Esteghlal. After his stunning performance against Al-Ahli on 25 April 2017, he was included in 2017 AFC Champions League team of the week. He finished the season with 23 appearances as Esteghlal finished the season as runners-up in the league.

Boavista
On July 2017, Robson signed with Portuguese club Boavista signing a three-year deal. He made his debut in a 2–1 defeat against Portimonense S.C.

Botafogo-SP
On 13 February 2020, Robson returned to Brazil and signed with Botafogo-SP.

Career statistics

Club 

1 Includes Copa Sudamericana and AFC Champions League matches.

References

1994 births
Living people
Brazilian footballers
Association football defenders
Campeonato Brasileiro Série B players
J1 League players
Persian Gulf Pro League players
Primeira Liga players
Esporte Clube Bahia players
Kawasaki Frontale players
Esteghlal F.C. players
Boavista F.C. players
UAE Pro League players
Baniyas Club players
Khor Fakkan Sports Club players
Botafogo Futebol Clube (SP) players
Grêmio Novorizontino players
Brazilian expatriate footballers
Expatriate footballers in Japan
Expatriate footballers in Iran
Expatriate footballers in Portugal
Expatriate footballers in the United Arab Emirates
Brazilian expatriate sportspeople in Japan
Brazilian expatriate sportspeople in Iran
Brazilian expatriate sportspeople in Portugal
Brazilian expatriate sportspeople in the United Arab Emirates